Krasimir Kostov (born 11 February 1995) is a Bulgarian footballer currently playing as a goalkeeper for Botev Vratsa.

Career
Kostov started to play football in the local side of his home village Kolarovo, Petrich Municipality. In 2007, when he was 12 years old, he joined Pirin 2001 Football Academy, where he honed his footballing skills.

In January 2014, Kostov signed with B Group club Pirin Razlog. He made his senior debut on 12 April 2014, keeping a clean sheet in a 3–0 home win over Haskovo. Kostov ended the season with 5 clean sheets out of 7 appearances.

In June 2014, Kostov joined Pirin Blagoevgrad. His first season with Pirin went very well and he had kept clean sheets in 14 of his 18 appearances, helping the club to win promotion to the A Group. On 9 July 2015, Kostov signed his first professional contract in his career. He made his A Group debut in a 1–1 home draw against Cherno More Varna on 19 July 2015.

On 21 June 2018, Kostov signed with Botev Vratsa.

Career statistics

Club

References

External links
 

1995 births
Living people
People from Petrich
Bulgarian footballers
Bulgaria under-21 international footballers
First Professional Football League (Bulgaria) players
Second Professional Football League (Bulgaria) players
Association football goalkeepers
FC Pirin Razlog players
OFC Pirin Blagoevgrad players
FC Botev Vratsa players
Sportspeople from Blagoevgrad Province
21st-century Bulgarian people